Rickenella fibula or Omphalina fibula is a species of fungus belonging to the genus Rickenella. It is orange to yellow and occurs among moss. The stipe is relatively long. It has little odor or taste, and is regarded as nonpoisonous.

According to molecular analysis, the species is more closely related to certain polypores and crust fungi than other gilled mushrooms. A similar species is Rickenella swartzii.

References

External links

Fungi described in 1784
Repetobasidiaceae